John Brocket or Brockett may refer to:

Sir John Brocket (died 1558) (1523–1558), English MP for Hertfordshire, 1553, 1555
Sir John Brocket (died 1598) (1540–1598), son of the above, English MP for Hertfordshire, 1572
John Brockett (American colonist) (1611–1690), American colonist
John Trotter Brockett (1788–1842), English antiquary